The Ostrich Has Two Eggs (French: Les oeufs de l'autruche) is a 1957 French comedy film directed by Denys de La Patellière and starring Pierre Fresnay, Simone Renant and Georges Poujouly. It was based on a play by André Roussin.

The film's sets were designed by the art director Paul-Louis Boutié.

Synopsis
A father sticks his head in a sand like an ostrich, while his two growing children become increasingly sexually experienced.

Cast
 Pierre Fresnay as Hippolyte Barjus
 Simone Renant as Thérèse Barjus
 Georges Poujouly as Roger Barjus
 Mady Berry as Leonie	
 Paul Mercey as le barman bavard	
 Yoko Tani as la comtesse Yoko
 Guy Bertil as le journaliste
 André Roussin as 	Henri
 Marguerite Pierry as 	Mme. Grombert
 François Chaumette as  M. Marlatier

References

Bibliography 
 Goble, Alan. The Complete Index to Literary Sources in Film. Walter de Gruyter, 1999.

External links 
 

1957 films
French comedy films
1957 comedy films
1950s French-language films
French films based on plays
Films directed by Denys de La Patellière
1950s French films